Revenge of the Slitheen is the first serial of the first series of the British science fiction television series The Sarah Jane Adventures, and the second story of the show overall following the special episode "Invasion of the Bane". The first part aired on BBC One on 24 September 2007, with the second premiering immediately after the first on the CBBC Channel. This serial is notable for introducing Clyde Langer into the cast – he would remain for the rest of the series.

Plot
Maria Jackson, Luke Smith, and Clyde Langer begin their first day at Park Vale School. Maria and Clyde have recently moved to Ealing, and Luke, having been artificially created the previous day, has never attended school before. After discovering the food is mouldy and the school's new technology block has a strange metallic smell, Sarah Jane investigates a company that has created the school's new technology block the next day, discovering the same rotting of fresh food and the smell happened at buildings in several other countries.

At lunchtime, Luke unknowingly helps members of the Slitheen family, disguised as teachers and a student, solve a problem in an unstable capacitor system that can switch off the sun by converting its heat and light into energy. Seeking revenge on Slitheen members that were killed on Earth, they intend to have the atmosphere "snatched away", and profit off the remains of the planet while remaining safely inside a secret room in the technology block buildings. After hours, Maria and Luke investigate the technology block in their school, and are followed by Clyde, who finds them to be strange. Maria and Clyde are hunted by Slitheen disguised as the teacher Mr Jeffrey and genius pupil Carl. Sarah Jane is attacked by a Slitheen who disguised herself as a company secretary, Janine. Luke finds the secret room and is confronted by the Slitheen commander, his headmaster Blakeman.

Sarah Jane escapes and saves Maria, Luke, and Clyde, sealing the Slitheen in the school. Luke figures out that the school is only part of the capacitor that reaches around the world, and Clyde figures out that the Slitheen are negatively affected by vinegar. The team heads off back to the school with squeezy bottles of vinegar. After Maria uses the vinegar to blow up Blakeman, they then head over to the secret room. As Luke did not predict they were using the capacitor on the Sun, the Slitheen are forced to reset the system. Luke overloads the system with Sarah Jane's sonic lipstick, electrocuting Janine and Jeffery to death, while some of the other Slitheen teleport away. Later, Sarah Jane informs her friends that UNIT are clearing up the technology in the secret room. She accepts Clyde into the team.

Continuity
Upon realising who she's dealing with, Sarah Jane quotes Rose Tyler's remarks on "Slitheen in Downing Street" from the episode "School Reunion".

The Headteacher says 'For the Love of Clom', referring to Raxacoricofallapitorius's twin Planet first mentioned in "Love & Monsters". He also mentions the Blathereen, another family from their planet who would later be seen in the series in the episode "The Gift".

Cast notes
The American Newsreader played by Lachele Carl previously appeared in the Doctor Who episodes "Aliens of London", "World War Three", "The Christmas Invasion" and "The Sound of Drums".

Novelisation

This was the second of eleven Sarah Jane Adventures serials to be adapted as a novel. Written by Rupert Laight, the book was first published in paperback on 1 November 2007.

Notes

References

External links

Sarah Jane Adventures homepage

Novelisation

The Sarah Jane Adventures episodes
Films with screenplays by Gareth Roberts (writer)
Slitheen television stories
2007 British television episodes
Television episodes set in schools